The Offpiste Discovery is a series of British high-wing, single or two-place, hang gliders that were designed by Bill Pain and produced by Colin Lark's company Offpiste Aviation Limited (Off The Beaten Track) of Dursley, Gloucestershire. Now out of production, when it was available the series of aircraft were supplied complete and ready-to-fly.

Design and development
The Discovery series was designed as a Super Floater glider, for fun, local flying and an emphasis on lightness of weight, ease of rigging and simple handling requirements. It is made from aluminum tubing, with the single-surface wing covered in Dacron sailcloth. All models were British Hang Gliding and Paragliding Association certified.

The series have been frequently used in conjunction with a powered harness, as powered hang gliders.

By the mid-2000s the series had become the best-selling hang gliders in the UK.

Variants
Discovery 160
Small-sized model for lighter pilots. Its  span wing is cable braced from a single kingpost.
Discovery 195
Large-sized model for heavier pilots. Its  span wing is cable braced from a single kingpost.
Discovery 195S
Reinforced 195 model for much heavier pilots. Its  span wing is cable braced from a single kingpost.
Discovery Bi 210
Model for dual use. Its  span wing is cable braced from a single kingpost.

Specifications (Discovery 160)

References

Discovery
Hang gliders